Richard Arlen (born Sylvanus Richard Mattimore, September 1, 1899 – March 28, 1976) was an American actor of film and television.

Biography
Born in St. Paul, Minnesota, Arlen attended the University of Pennsylvania. He served in Canada as a pilot in the Royal Flying Corps during World War I. After the war, he went to the oilfields of Texas and Oklahoma and found work as a tool boy. He was thereafter a messenger and sporting editor of a newspaper before going to Los Angeles to act in films, but no producer wanted him. He was a delivery boy for a film laboratory when the motorcycle which he was riding landed him a broken leg outside the Paramount Pictures lot. A sympathetic film director gave him his start as an extra. He appeared at first in silent films before making the transition to talkies. His first important film role was in Vengeance of the Deep (1923).

He took time out from his Hollywood career to teach as a United States Army Air Forces flight instructor in World War II.
 
Arlen is best known for his role as a pilot in the Academy Award-winning Wings (1927) with Clara Bow, Charles 'Buddy' Rogers, Gary Cooper, El Brendel, and his second wife, Jobyna Ralston, whom he married in 1927. Arlen later appeared in the science fiction horror Island of Lost Souls (1932) with Charles Laughton, adapted from the H.G. Wells novel The Island of Dr. Moreau. He was among the more famous residents of the celebrity enclave, Toluca Lake, California. He married New York socialite, Margaret Kinsella, in 1946.

In 1939, Universal teamed him with Andy Devine for a series of 14 B-pictures, mostly action-comedies with heavy reliance on stock footage from larger-scale films. They are informally known as the "Aces of Action" series, which is how the stars were billed in the trailers. When Arlen left the studio in 1941, the series continued with Devine teamed with a variety of other actors.

In the 1950s and early 1960s, Arlen was active in television, having guest starred in several anthology series, including Playhouse 90, The Loretta Young Show, The 20th Century Fox Hour, and in three episodes of the series about clergymen, Crossroads.

In 1960, Arlen was inducted into the Hollywood Walk of Fame with a motion pictures star at 6755 Hollywood Boulevard for his contributions to the film industry.

In 1968, he appeared on Petticoat Junction playing himself.  The episode was called "Wings" and it was in direct reference to the 1927 silent movie Wings.

Arlen appeared in westerns, such as Lawman, Branded, Bat Masterson, Wanted: Dead or Alive, Wagon Train, and Yancy Derringer, and in such drama/adventure programs as Ripcord, Whirlybirds, Perry Mason, The New Breed, Coronado 9, and Michael Shayne.

Political views
Arlen supported Barry Goldwater in the 1964 United States presidential election.

Death
On March 28, 1976, Arlen died in North Hollywood, California. He was interred at Holy Cross Cemetery in Culver City, California.

Filmography

Features

Ladies Must Live (1921) as Minor Role (uncredited)
The Green Temptation (1922) (uncredited)
The Ghost Breaker (1922) as One of the 'Ghosts' (uncredited)
Quicksands (1923) (uncredited)
Vengeance of the Deep (1923) as Jean
Hollywood (1923) as Himself
The Fighting Coward (1924) as Minor Role (uncredited)
Sally (1925) as Minor Role (uncredited)
In the Name of Love (1925) as Dumas Dufrayne
The Coast of Folly (1925) as Bather (scenes deleted)
The Enchanted Hill (1926) as Link Halliwell
Behind the Front (1926) as Percy Brown
Padlocked (1926) as 'Tubby' Clark
You'd Be Surprised (1926) as Photographer (uncredited)
Old Ironsides (1926) as Seaman (uncredited)
Wings (1927) as David Armstrong
Rolled Stockings (1927) as Ralph Treadway
The Blood Ship (1927) as John Shreve
Sally in Our Alley (1927) as Jimmie Adams
Figures Don't Lie (1927) as Bob Blewe
She's a Sheik (1927) as Capt. Colton
Under the Tonto Rim (1928) as Edd Denmeade
Feel My Pulse (1928) as Her Problem
Ladies of the Mob (1928) as Red
Beggars of Life (1928) as The Boy (Jim)
Manhattan Cocktail (1928) as Fred Tilden
The Man I Love (1929) as Dum-Dum Brooks
The Four Feathers (1929) as Lt. Harry Faversham
Thunderbolt (1929) as Bob Moran
Dangerous Curves (1929) as Larry Lee
The Virginian (1929) as Steve
Burning Up (1930) as Lou Larrigan
The Border Legion (1930) as Heyst
Dangerous Paradise (1930) as Dick Bailey
The Light of Western Stars (1930) as Jim Cleve
Paramount on Parade (1930, also appeared in Spanish and French-dubbed versions) as Hunter – Episode 'Dream Girl'
The Sea God (1930) as Phillip 'Pink' Barker
The Santa Fe Trail (1930) as Stan Hollister
Only Saps Work (1930) as Lawrence Payne
The Conquering Horde (1931) as Dan McMasters
Gun Smoke (1931) as Brad Farley
The Lawyer's Secret (1931) as Joe Hart
The Secret Call (1931) as Tom Blake
Caught (1931) as Lt. Tom Colton
Touchdown (1931) as Dan Curtis
Wayward (1932) as David Frost
Sky Bride (1932) as Bert 'Speed' Condon
Guilty as Hell (1932) as Frank C. Marsh
Tiger Shark (1932) as Pipes Boley
The All American (1932) as Gary King
Island of Lost Souls (1932) as Edward Parker
Song of the Eagle (1933) as Bill Hoffman
College Humor (1933) as Mondrake
Three-Cornered Moon (1933) as Dr. Alan Stevens
Golden Harvest (1933) as Walt Martin
Hell and High Water (1933) as Capt. J.J. Jericho
Alice in Wonderland (1933) as Cheshire Cat
Come On Marines! (1934) as Lucky Davis
She Made Her Bed (1934) as Wild Bill Smith
Ready for Love (1934) as Julian Barrow
Helldorado (1934) as Art Ryan
Let 'Em Have It (1935) as Mal Stevens
The Calling of Dan Matthews (1935) as Dan Matthews
Three Live Ghosts (1936) as William 'Bill' Jones, an alias of William Foster
The Mine with the Iron Door (1936) as Bob Harvey
Secret Valley (1937) as Lee Rogers
The Great Barrier (1937) as Hickey
Artists and Models (1937) as Alan Townsend
Murder in Greenwich Village (1937) as Steve Havens Jackson Jr.
No Time to Marry (1938) as Perry Brown
Call of the Yukon (1938) as Gaston Rogers
Straight, Place and Show (1938) as Denny Paine
Missing Daughters (1939) as Wally King
 Mutiny on the Blackhawk (1939) as Capt. Robert Lawrence
Tropic Fury (1939) as Dan Burton
 Legion of Lost Flyers (1939) as Gene 'Loop' Gillan
 Man from Montreal (1939) as Clark Manning
Danger on Wheels (1940) as Larry Taylor
Hot Steel (1940) as Frank Stewart
The Leather Pushers (1940) as Dick 'Kid' Roberts
 The Devil's Pipeline (1940) as Dick Talbot
 Black Diamonds (1940) as Walter Norton
Lucky Devils (1941) as Dick McManus
Mutiny in the Arctic (1941) as Dick Barclay
Men of the Timberland (1941) as Dick O'Hara
Power Dive (1941) as Brad Farrell
Forced Landing (1941) as Dan Kendall
Raiders of the Desert (1941) as Dick Manning
A Dangerous Game (1941) as Dick Williams
Flying Blind (1941) as Jim Clark
Torpedo Boat (1942) as Skinner Barnes
Wildcat (1942) as Johnny Maverick
Wrecking Crew (1942) as Matt Carney
Submarine Alert (1943) as Lewis J. 'Lee' Deerhold
Aerial Gunner (1943) as Sgt / Lt. Jonathan 'Jon' Davis
Alaska Highway (1943) as Woody Ormsby
Minesweeper (1943) as Richard Houston – posing as Jim 'Tennessee' Smith
Timber Queen (1944) as Russell Evans
The Lady and the Monster (1944) as Dr. Patrick Cory
That's My Baby! (1944) as Tim Jones
Storm Over Lisbon (1944) as John Craig
The Big Bonanza (1944) as Captain Jed Kilton
Identity Unknown (1945) as Johnny March
The Phantom Speaks (1945) as Matt Fraser
Accomplice (1946) as Simon Lash
Buffalo Bill Rides Again (1947) as Buffalo Bill
Speed to Spare (1948) as Cliff Jordan
The Return of Wildfire (1948) as Dobe Williams
When My Baby Smiles at Me (1948) as Harvey Howell
Grand Canyon (1949) as Mike Adams
Kansas Raiders (1950) as Union Captain
Silver City (1951) as Charles Storrs
Flaming Feather (1952) as Showdown Calhoun
Hurricane Smith (1952) as Brundage
The Blazing Forest (1952) as Joe Morgan
Sabre Jet (1953) as Gen. Robert E. 'Bob' Hale
Devil's Harbor (1954) as John 'Captain' Martin
Stolen Time (1955) as Tony Pelassier
Hidden Guns (1956) as Sheriff Ward Young
The Mountain (1956) as C.W. Rivial
Cavalry Command (1958) as Sgt. Jim Heisler
Warlock (1959) as Bacon
Raymie (1960) as Garber
The Last Time I Saw Archie (1961) as Col. Edwin Martin
The Young and The Brave (1963) as Col. Ralph Holbein
The Crawling Hand (1963) as Lee Barrenger
Law of the Lawless (1964) as Ben the Bartender
The Best Man (1964) as Sen. Oscar Anderson
The Shepherd of the Hills (1964) as Old Matt
Young Fury (1964) as Sheriff Jenkins
Sex and the College Girl (1964) as Charles Devon
The Human Duplicators (1965) as Lt. Shaw – National Intelligence
Black Spurs (1965) as Pete Muchin
Town Tamer (1965) as Doctor Kent
The Bounty Killer (1965) as Matthew Ridgeway
Apache Uprising (1965) as Captain Gannon
Johnny Reno (1966) as Ned Duggan
To the Shores of Hell (1966) as Brig. Gen. F.W. Ramsgate
Waco (1966) as Sheriff Billy Kelly
Red Tomahawk (1967) as Deadwood Telegrapher
Hostile Guns (1967) as Sheriff Travis
Fort Utah (1967) as Sam Tyler
The Road to Nashville (1967) as Studio Boss
Buckskin (1968) as Townsman
Anzio (1968) as Capt. Gannon (uncredited)
Rogues' Gallery (1968) as Man in Club
The Sky's the Limit (1975) as Grimes
Won Ton Ton, the Dog Who Saved Hollywood (1976) as Silent Film Star 2
A Whale of a Tale (1977) as Mr. Monahan (final film role)

Short subjects

A Trip Through the Paramount Studio (1927) as Himself
Hollywood on Parade No. A-6 (1933) as Himself / The Great Arlen (uncredited)
Hollywood on Parade No. A-9 (1933) as Himself – Dick Arlen (uncredited)
How to Break 90 #4: Downswing (1933) as Himself – Dick Arlen (uncredited)
Hollywood on Parade No. B-6 (1934) as Himself
Hollywood Hobbies (1935) as Himself
Screen Snapshots Series 15, No. 3 (1935) as Himself
Swing with Bing (1940) as Himself – Movie Star playing Golf
Screen Snapshots: Sports in Hollywood (1940) as Himself, Golf Player
Soaring Stars (1942) as Himself (uncredited)
Unusual Occupations (1942) as Himself (uncredited)
Paramount Victory Short: A Letter from Bataan (1942) as Pvt. John W. Lewis
Bat Masterson (1961) as Sheriff Dan Rainey – S3E16 "The Price of Paradise"

References

External links

 
 
 
 
 
 
 Photographs of Richard Arlen

1899 births
1976 deaths
20th-century American male actors
American male film actors
American male silent film actors
American male television actors
Burials at Holy Cross Cemetery, Culver City
Deaths from emphysema
Male Western (genre) film actors
Male actors from Los Angeles
Male actors from Minnesota
Male actors from Saint Paul, Minnesota
Paramount Pictures contract players
Royal Flying Corps officers
United States Army Air Forces officers
United States Army Air Forces pilots of World War II
University of Pennsylvania alumni
British Army personnel of World War I
Respiratory disease deaths in California